The Communist Working Group (abbreviated KAG) was a political faction in Thuringia, Germany. Geithner and Schreyer had been expelled from KPD, whilst Schmidt resigned from the party to join KAG.

KAG fielded a list in the 30 January 1927 Landtag election, headed by Geithner, Schmidt and Schreyer. The KAG list failed to get any deputies elected, obtaining 3,732 votes (0.46%). Following the KAG electoral debacle, Schreyer joined the Social Democratic Party of Germany (SPD) whilst Schmidt withdrew from politics. Geithner joined Socialist Workers Party of Germany (SAP) in 1931.

References

Defunct communist parties in Germany
Political parties established in 1926